Reform Alliance may refer to:

Canadian Alliance, Canadian federal political party that existed from 2000–03
Reform Alliance, parole and probation reform organization based in the United States led by rapper Meek Mill
Reform Alliance (Ireland), an Irish parliamentary group of Fine Gael members, formed in 2013

See also
 Reform Party (disambiguation)